Charles-Alexandre Coëssin de la Fosse (1829–1910) was a French neoclassicist painter and engraver.

Life 

He was born in Lisieux, Calvados (a department in Normandy), he went in Paris in 1857 in a way to make his first exhibition. From this time and during his entire life, he exhibited regularly at the Salon. He painted mostly genre scenes—war, religion, and mythology—and is noted for his skill in composition and the use of color. He died in Paris in 1910.

His work is strongly influenced by the reaction against the Republic, and by the Catholic religion. This is obviously an expression of his personal conviction: actually his family was a noble and traditional one, but the influence of his patrons was probably determinative. Much of Coëssin de la Fosse's work represents the chouans, like L'embuscade (the ambush), or Catholic worship scenes such as Procession autour d'une croix en pierre (Procession around a stone cross).

Today, his work is owned by museums in Bayeux, Gray, Liège, Lisieux, Reims, Paris, and New York.

Work 

L'embuscade (oil on canvas)
Bénédiction des combattants vendéens (oil on canvas)
La joueuse de tambourin (oil on canvas, 1873)
Les politiques au Palais Royal (oil on canvas, 1873)
Après le banquet (oil on canvas, 1876)
La mort de Dom Juan (oil on canvas, 1878)
Une procession au Pardon de Ploumanac'h (oil on canvas, 1884)
Le sauvetage : chasse au lion en Arabie (drawing, 1886)
La fête de la raison (oil on canvas, 1889)
Pousse au large (oil on canvas, 1889)
Diane (oil on canvas, 1889)

See also 
 Thomas Couture
 François-Édouard Picot

References 
 Dictionnaire des artistes, Bellier de la Chevagnerie
 Répertoire général de Bio-Bibliographie bretonne, René Kerviler
 Les artistes normands au salon de 1874
 Explication des ouvrages de peinture, sculpture, architecture, gravure et lithographie des artistes vivants exposés au Palais de Champs-Elysées, mai 1889

External links

 Photograph of Bénédiction des combattants vendéens
 photograph of L'embuscade.
 Photograph of Diane
 Photograph of Le sauvetage : chasse au lion en Arabie, New York Public Library
 Photograph of La joueuse de tambourin
 Photograph of Deux anti-jacobins dans la matinée du 20 Brumaire An III

1829 births
1910 deaths
Neoclassical painters
19th-century French painters
French male painters
20th-century French painters
20th-century French male artists
19th-century French male artists